Mi-Hyun Kim (born 13 January 1977) is a professional golfer from South Korea. She turned professional in 1996 and won 11 events on the LPGA of Korea Tour (KLPGA) between 1996 and 2000. In 1999, she joined the LPGA Tour and was named was Rookie of the Year that year. She has won eight LPGA events with her best finish in a major championship second place at the 2001 Women's British Open.

Background
LPGA golfers also refer to her as "Kimmy." She was inspired to move to the United States by Se Ri Pak, and they along with Grace Park and Hee-Won Han – the four nicknamed the "Seoul Sisters" – are considered pioneers in the surge of outstanding South Korean women's golfers on the LPGA Tour. Her swing is characterized by an unusually long backswing that has become shorter in recent years.

Charitable giving
In May 2007, Kim donated $100,000 of her $210,000 prize money from winning the SemGroup Championship to victims of a recent tornado that severely damaged the town of Greensburg, Kansas. The tornado occurred during the SemGroup tournament.

Kim did not have any connection to Greensburg or any of its residents. Commenting on her donation, she said, "Honestly, I made a lot of money in the United States on the LPGA Tour. Most of time, I get the money here and donate to South Korea. But, I want to help people here, too. The win was a surprise for me and I think God gave it to me like a special present or he is using me like, 'okay, I give you this, but after that you give to help the people.'"

A year later on the eve on the 2008 SemGroup Championship, the president of the United Way of the Plains in Wichita, Kansas appeared with Kim at the pre-tournament press conference to publicly thank her and announce that the publicity surrounding Kim's donation had spurred further donations totaling $1.2 million and that money is being used to build 25 homes for low- and moderate-income individuals displaced by the tornado.

Personal
Kim retired from the LPGA Tour after playing several tournaments during the 2011 season. In December 2008 she married Lee Won-hee, a former Olympic gold medalist in judo who now teaches judo at a university in South Korea. In 2009 they had a son, Ye Sung Lee, who was born in Orlando, Florida. The couple divorced in 2012.

She currently teaches golf in South Korea. A golf teaching/practice facility built by her father is named the Mi-Hyun Kim Golf World.

Professional wins (19)

LPGA Tour (8)

LPGA Tour playoff record (3–3)

LPGA of Korea Tour wins (13)

Tournaments in bold denotes major tournaments in KLPGA

Results in LPGA majors

^ The Women's British Open replaced the du Maurier Classic as an LPGA major in 2001.

CUT = missed the half-way cut
"T" tied

Summary
Starts – 48
Wins – 0
2nd-place finishes – 1
3rd-place finishes – 1
Top 3 finishes – 2
Top 5 finishes – 4
Top 10 finishes – 13
Top 25 finishes – 19
Missed cuts – 9
Most consecutive cuts made – 16
Longest streak of top-10s – 3

Team appearances
Amateur
Espirito Santo Trophy (representing South Korea): 1994

References

External links

Biography on seoulsisters.com

South Korean female golfers
LPGA Tour golfers
LPGA of Korea Tour golfers
Sungkyunkwan University alumni
Sportspeople from Incheon
Gwangsan Kim clan
1977 births
Living people